Larisa Filina, nee Fedorinova is a former Soviet ice dancer. Competing as Larisa Fedorinova with partner Evgeni Platov, she won the 1988 Karl Schäfer Memorial and finished 6th at the 1989 World Championships in Paris, France.

Results
(as Fedorinova with Evgeni Platov)

References

Soviet female ice dancers
Living people
Year of birth missing (living people)